The 1995 Campeonato Nacional, known as Campeonato Nacional Copa Banco del Estado 1995 for sponsorship purposes, was the 63rd season of top-flight football in Chile. Universidad de Chile won their ninth title following a 2–0 home win against Deportes Temuco on 3 December. Universidad Católica also qualified for the next Copa Libertadores as Liguilla winners.

Final table

Results

Top goalscorers

Liguilla Pre-Copa Libertadores

Universidad Católica also qualified for the 1996 Copa Libertadores

Promotion/relegation play-offs

Regional Atacama and Huachipato stayed in the Primera División Chilena

See also
1995 Copa Chile

Notes

References
RSSSF Page
national-football-teams
Statistics

Primera División de Chile seasons
Chile
1995 in Chilean football